Bladen may refer to:

 Bladen, Belize, a village in Toledo District, Belize
 Bladen, Georgia
 Bladen County, North Carolina
 Bladen, Nebraska
 Bladen, Poland
 Bladen (surname)